Wilhelm Róbert Wessman (born 4 October 1969) is an Icelandic business executive and founder of the pharmaceutical and biotechnology companies Alvotech and Alvogen.

Early life 
Wessman was born in Reykjavík on 4 October 1969 to Wilhelm Wessman, a business person, and Ólöf Svafarsdóttir Wessman, a beautician. He grew up in Seltjarnarnes and moved to Mosfellsbær when he was six years old. He went to school at Menntaskólinn við Sund and received a bachelor's degree in business administration from the University of Iceland in 1993. After graduating, he worked for Samskip for seven years, first in the finance department, then in the sales department, before finally serving as the CEO of the firm and moving to Germany. During that time he also taught mathematics on a part-time basis at the University of Iceland.

Career 
Since 1999, Wessman's career has been focused on the generics and biosimilars sectors of the pharmaceuticals industry. The two domains differ significantly in terms of what they make and sell, but the business challenge common to both is to make and distribute lower-cost versions of brand-name therapeutics whose patent protection has expired.

Delta, Pharmaco and Actavis 
In 1999, Wessman was appointed CEO of Delta, a generic drug manufacturer in Reykjavik. Following a merger with another Icelandic pharmaceutical company, Pharmaco, in 2002, Delta was rebranded as Actavis in 2004. Wessman's tenure at Activis was characterized by rapid growth and expansion into international markets through a series of acquisitions across Europe, Asia, and the US. By 2004, the company had acquired 16 companies and had operations in 25 countries, manufacturing and selling hundreds of products. In 2005, Actavis, traded on the Icelandic stock exchange, had a market capitalization of $1.9bn. In 2006, it acquired two US generics companies to enter the US market, subsequently acquiring additional manufacturing plants in the US, Russia, Romania and India. In 2008, Wessman stepped down from his position as CEO of Actavis, by which time it had grown to 11,000 employees and was one of the biggest generic drug companies in the world. Wessman's business strategy at Actavis was documented in a 2008 case study published by Harvard Business School entitled ‘Robert Wessman and Actavis’ “Winning Formula.”’

Alvogen 
In 2009 Wessman founded the biotechnology company Alvogen. Alvogen started by acquiring a distressed generics maker in New York, and R&D capabilities and product portfolios in New Jersey. Over the following five years, built on a string of acquisitions, Wessman expanded production, the product portfolio and marketing efforts focusing on Eastern Europe and South Asia, then acquiring major production sites in Taiwan and South Korea. By 2016, Alvogen was estimated to be worth $4bn. Wessman's strategy in building Alvogen has been the subject of two Harvard Business School case studies.

Alvotech 
In 2013, Wessman founded Alvotech, a company that manufactures biosimilars. It was originally conceived as a minority-owned spinoff of Alvogen. It was founded with a $250m investment to build its headquarters and manufacturing facility on the University of Iceland's campus in central Reykjavik. Alvotech's strategy to compete in this market has been to focus solely on biosimilars development and production, with vertically integrated capabilities, enabling tight control over quality and costs, and with commercial partnerships to market its products around the world. At the end of 2021, Alvotech had seven biosimilars in development, the most advanced of which was a biosimilar for Humira, which has been approved for use in the EU. In December 2021, the company announced that it was entering a merger with Special-purpose acquisition company (or SPAC) Oaktree Acquisition Corp. II with the aim of listing on the Nasdaq stock market in 2022. Alvotech's press release on the merger stated that to date more than $1bn had been invested in its platform and capabilities, and the merger agreement valued the combined company at $2.25bn.

Controversies 
In 2018 Morgunblaðið published a report showing that one third of the Alvogen's share belonged to a private firm that Wessman had established on the offshore island of Jersey in 2015.

In November 2022, Alvogen and a former executive settled a dispute over allegations of bullying made against Wessman the previous year.

References 

1969 births
Living people
Robert Wessman